The Women's 75 kg weightlifting event at the 2002 Commonwealth Games took place at the Manchester International Convention Centre on 3 August 2002.

Schedule
All times are Coordinated Universal Time (UTC)

Records
Prior to this competition, the existing world, Commonwealth and Games records were as follows:

The following records were established during the competition:

Results

References

Weightlifting at the 2002 Commonwealth Games